National Highway 166H, commonly referred to as NH 166H is a national highway in India. It is a secondary route of National Highway 66.  NH-166H runs in the state of Maharashtra in India.

Route 
NH 166H connects Sangli city and Peth Naka in the state of Maharashtra.

Miraj - Sangli - Ashta -  Islampur - Peth Naka

Junctions  
 
  Terminal near Sangli.
  near Miraj.
  Terminal near Peth Naka.

See also 
 List of National Highways in India
 List of National Highways in India by state

References

External links 

 NH 166H on OpenStreetMap

National highways in India
National Highways in Maharashtra